Benhardt F. Fose (March 20, 1921 – June 19, 1993) was an American football coach. He served as the head football coach at Sterling College in Sterling, Kansas for one season, in 1960, compiling a record of 1–8. Fose was a veteran of World War II. He died at his residence in Pueblo, Colorado in 1993.

Head coaching record

References

External links
 

1921 births
1993 deaths
Sterling Warriors football coaches
United States Army personnel of World War II
People from Russell, Kansas
United States Army soldiers